Ally Detroit Center, formerly One Detroit Center, is a skyscraper and class-A office building located in Downtown Detroit, overlooking the Detroit Financial District. Rising , the 43-story tower is the tallest office building in Michigan and the second tallest building overall in the state behind the central hotel tower of the Renaissance Center, located a few blocks away. Although the Penobscot Building has more floors above ground (45), those of Ally Detroit Center are taller, with its roof sitting roughly  taller than that of the Penobscot.

Architecture

The building was designed by noted architects John Burgee & Philip Johnson, partners influential in postmodern architecture. Ally Detroit Center was constructed from 1991 to 1993. It houses numerous tenants, including many prominent Detroit law firms and PricewaterhouseCoopers. In addition to retail, the building also contains a restaurant and a gym.

The building is famous for its postmodern architectural design topped with Flemish-inspired neo-gothic spires which blend architecturally with the city's historic skyline. It is constructed mainly of granite. Sometimes called a "twin gothic structure", for its pairs of spires, it is oriented North-South and East-West (as named on a plaque along the Windsor waterfront park). Ally Detroit Center won an Award of Excellence for its design in 1996. Ally Detroit Center replicas have become a souvenir item along with those of other Detroit skyscrapers.

Project plans for a twin tower directly to the east, Two Detroit Center, were placed indefinitely on hold. Two Detroit Center parking garage was constructed on the site in 2002.

Tenants
The law firm Dickinson Wright (formerly Dickinson, Wright, Moon, Van Dusen & Freeman) has its headquarters in Ally Detroit Center. The company moved into the building when it opened in 1992. In 2007, when it renewed its lease, the company occupied almost  of space in the building.  Additionally, the international law firm of Clark Hill, PLC operates its headquarters on three floors of the building.

The building was previously occupied by Comerica Bank. The bank's lease on then Comerica Tower at Detroit Center ran through 2012, and in December 2009, Comerica announced it would vacate One Detroit Center at the end of the lease, consolidating its Michigan operations at 411 West Lafayette Boulevard.

The tower was renamed Ally Detroit Center.

In 2015, a full service restaurant, Townhouse, opened in the first floor of the Ally Detroit Center, situated on the corner of Woodward and Congress.  In 2019, a Plum Market grocery store was opened in the first floor, with an entrance at the corner of Woodward and Larned.

Gallery

References

Further reading

External links

 One Detroit Center website

Bank buildings in Michigan
Downtown Detroit
Woodward Avenue
Skyscraper office buildings in Detroit
Office buildings completed in 1993
1993 establishments in Michigan
Rock Ventures
John Burgee buildings
Philip Johnson buildings
Postmodern architecture in the United States
Gothic Revival skyscrapers